The Diocese of Alaska is a diocese of the Orthodox Church in America (OCA).  Its territory includes parishes, monasteries, and missions located in Alaska. The diocesan chancery is located in Anchorage. The Diocese was founded when Alaska was part of Russia and is one of the oldest in the United States. The Church of the Holy Ascension (1826), which belongs to the Diocese, is one of the oldest American churches. 

Altogether, twenty-three churches are listed on the National Register of Historic Places; thirty churches are considered National Historic Landmarks. As of 2013, the Diocese includes 89 parishes, which represents the highest concentration of Orthodox Church in America parishes among the states.

According to the Los Angeles Times, the diocese had around 30,000 members statewide as of 2006.

Deaneries
The diocese is grouped geographically into deaneries. Each deanery is headed by a parish priest, known as a dean. The deans coordinate activities in their area's parishes, and report to the diocesan bishop. As of 2015, the deaneries of the Diocese of Alaska are:

 Alaska Peninsula Deanery
 Aleutian Deanery
 Anchorage Deanery
 Bethel and Kuskokwim Deanery 
 Bristol Bay Deanery
 Iliamna Deanery
 Kenai and Prince William Sound Deanery
 Kodiak Deanery
 Russian Mission and Yukon Deanery
 Sitka and Southeast Deanery

Bishops

Alaska Vicariate of the North American Diocese
 Innocent (Pustynsky) (14 December 1903 - 1 May 1909)
 Alexander (Nemolovsky) (15 November 1909 - 6 July 1916)
 Philip (Stavitsky) (6 August 1916 - April 1919)
 Anthony (Dashkievich) (11 December 1921 - 1922)
 Amphilochius (Vakulsky) (28 July 1924 - September 1930)
 Antonin (Vasilyev) (11 October 1930 - 1934)

Diocese of Alaska
 Alexis (Panteleev) (November 1934 - 1944)
 John (Zlobin) (10 March 1946 - ca. 1952)
 Ambrose (Merezhko) (11 September 1955 - 1967)
 Theodosius (Lazor) (6 May 1967 - 30 May 1972)
 Gregory (Afonsky) (13 May 1973 - 20 July 1995)
 Herman (Swaiko) (1995 - ca. Consecration. 2001) locum tenens
 Nicholas (Soraich) (4 March 2002 - 13 May 2008)
 Locum tenens: Herman (Swaiko) (13 May 2008 - 4 September 2008)
 Locum tenens: Benjamin (Peterson) (4 September 2008 - 21 February 2014)
 David (Mahaffey) (21 February 2014 - 27 November 2020)
Diocesan administrator: Alexis (Trader) (3 November 2020 - 27 March 2022)
 Alexis (Trader) (27 March 2022 - present)

See also
 List of Orthodox parishes in Alaska

References

External links

 
 St. Herman Orthodox Theological Seminary
 Russian Orthodox Sacred Sites in Alaska
 Alaskan Orthodox texts (Aleut, Alutiiq, Tlingit, Yup'ik)
 Russian Orthodox Churches in Alaska, Watercolors, Alaska's Digital Archives

Alaska
Eastern Orthodoxy in Alaska
Organizations based in Anchorage, Alaska